Tarmo Oja (born 21 December 1934 in Tallinn, Estonia) is a professor in astronomy at Uppsala University who studies galactic structure and variable stars. He was the director at the Swedish Kvistaberg Station of the Uppsala Observatory from 1970 until his retirement in 1999.

As a senior professor he continued his observations (work) at the observatory at Kvistaberg until the spring of 2006, when he moved (back) to Uppsala together with his wife Silvi.

Awards and honors 
In 2001, Estonian President Lennart Meri awarded Oja the Order of the White Star V Class for his contribution to science. The asteroid 5080 Oja, discovered at the Kvistaberg Station, was named in his honor in 1992.

References 
 

1934 births
20th-century Swedish astronomers
Estonian astronomers
Academic staff of Uppsala University
Living people
Estonian emigrants to Sweden
People from Tallinn
Estonian World War II refugees
Recipients of the Order of the White Star, 5th Class